Jeffrey Matthew Bourman (born 19 February 1967) is an Australian politician. He is a Shooters, Fishers and Farmers Party member of the Victorian Legislative Council, having represented Eastern Victoria Region since 2014. Jeff Bourman was the founder of the Victorian Branch of the Shooters, Fishers and Farmers Party and has served as the Chairman of the Victorian Branch since its inception.

Bourman was a police officer with Victoria Police, before leaving to pursue a career in information technology.

According to  The Age, between November 2018 and November 2021, Bourman voted with the Andrews Government's position 48.2% of the time.

Bourman was first elected at the 2014 Victorian state election and re-elected in 2018 and 2022. Bourman is married with one child and lives in Hampton East, Victoria.

References

External links
 Parliamentary voting record of Jeff Bourman at Victorian Parliament Tracker

1967 births
Living people
Shooters, Fishers and Farmers Party politicians
Shooters, Fishers and Farmers Party Members of the Parliament of Victoria
Members of the Victorian Legislative Council
Australian police officers
21st-century Australian politicians
People from Hampton, Victoria